Ursulaea (named for Ursula Baensch, plant breeder and co-author of Blooming Bromeliads) is a genus in the plant family Bromeliaceae, subfamily Bromelioideae.  Some authorities treat Ursulaea as a synonym of Aechmea. There are two known species, both endemic to Mexico.

Species

References

External links

FCBS Ursulaea Photos
BSI Genera Gallery photos

 
Endemic flora of Mexico
Bromeliaceae genera